was a professional wrestling event promoted by DDT Pro-Wrestling (DDT). The event took place on July 24, 2011, in Tokyo at the Ryōgoku Kokugikan. The event featured nine matches, five of which were contested for championships. The event aired on Fighting TV Samurai.

Storylines
The Ryōgoku Peter Pan 2011 event featured nine professional wrestling matches that involved different wrestlers from pre-existing scripted feuds and storylines. Wrestlers portrayed villains, heroes, or less distinguishable characters in the scripted events that built tension and culminated in a wrestling match or series of matches.

By winning the King of DDT tournament on May 29, Kudo earned a title match in the main event against KO-D Openweight Champion Shuji Ishikawa.

On June 18 at Dominion 6.18, Prince Devitt lost his IWGP Junior Heavyweight Championship to Best of the Super Juniors winner, Kota Ibushi. Devitt received his rematch at Ryōgoku Peter Pan 2011.

Event
As in the previous year, Michael Nakazawa's anal blast was held as the opening ceremony. This time Nakazawa was selected by a fan votation. The detonation was carried out by retired wrestler Dick Togo using a "bazooka".

In the dark match preceding the main card, Sanshiro Takagi and Munenori Sawa from Battlearts challenged the team of Ricky Fuji and The Great Sasuke from Michinoku Pro Wrestling in a Falls Count Anywhere match for the Greater China Unified Zhongyuan Tag Team Championship. The match took place in various rooms of the backstage area.

In the Ironman Rumble match, Antonio Honda captured the Ironman Heavymetalweight Championship by eliminating former champion Daisuke Sasaki. However, just after the match, Gorgeous Matsuno surprised Honda and pinned him to become the new champion.

The four-way tag team elimination match saw the participations of Daisuke Sekimoto from Big Japan Pro Wrestling and Gentaro from Pro-Wrestling Freedoms. Minoru Fujita competed under the name "Hero!", the former name of his tag team partner Harashima.

Danshoku Dino faced Bob Sapp in a match scheduled for thirty rounds, with each round being three minutes in duration.

Results

Ironman Rumble

Four-way tag team elimination match

Summer Night Fever in Ryōgoku 5 vs. 5 Elimination match

Footnotes

References

External links
The official DDT Pro-Wrestling website
Ryōgoku Peter Pan 2011 at ProWrestlingHistory.com

DDT Peter Pan
2011 in professional wrestling
July 2011 events in Japan
Professional wrestling in Tokyo
2011 in Tokyo
Events in Tokyo